Heingang Assembly Constituency is one of the 60 Vidhan Sabha constituencies in the Indian state of Manipur.

Members of Legislative Assembly

Election results

2022

2017 result

See also
 Manipur Legislative Assembly
 List of constituencies of Manipur Legislative Assembly
 Imphal East district

References

External links
 

Assembly constituencies of Manipur
Imphal West district